Peter G. Levine (December 22, 1960 - January 8, 2022) was an American medical researcher, science educator, and authority on stroke recovery. He published articles in peer-reviewed journals on brain plasticity as it relates to stroke, with emphasis on modified constraint induced therapy, cortical reorganization, telerehabilitation, electrical stimulation, electromyography-triggered stimulation, mental practice, cortical plasticity, acquired brain injury, spasticity, sensation recovery, evidence-based practice, outcome measures, and others. His articles have been widely cited by the medical community. His 2013 book Stronger After Stroke is regarded as an authoritative guide for patients and therapists dealing with stroke and it has received numerous positive reviews, and has been translated into Indonesian, Japanese, and Korean. His seminars throughout the United States were described by one reviewer as "funny, entertaining, engaging, dynamic, well organized, passionate and lighthearted." Levine was a trainer of stroke-specific outcome measures for The Ohio State University; B.R.A.I.N. Lab. He was a researcher and co-director at the Neuromotor Recovery and Rehabilitation Laboratory at the University of Cincinnati College of Medicine. Before that, he was a researcher at the Human Performance & Motion Analysis Laboratory, which is the research arm of the Kessler Institute for Rehabilitation.

Early life 
Levine's father, Martin Levine, was an IBM-trained systems analyst. The Levine family moved constantly. Peter attended 14 different schools K-12, including Lanikai Elementary in Honolulu, Hawaii, the Overseas School of Rome, and during high school, the Community School, in Tehran. In early 1979, the family was included in the mass evacuation of Americans from Tehran using U.S. C141A military transports from Mehrabad Airport. After graduating from George Mason University, Levine moved to Austin, Texas in 1987 and joined the grunge band Flowerhead shortly thereafter.

Personal life 
Levine lived in Cincinnati, Ohio with his Finnish-born wife, Aila Mella, a physical therapist. They had two children together.

Publications

Books
 Stronger After Stroke by Peter G. Levine, Demos Medical Publishing, New York (2009 1st ed., 2012 2nd ed. 2018 3rd ed.); Indonesian version, Depok publishers (2011); Japanese version, GAIABOOKS publishers (2014), Korean version, Freedom to Dream Seoul Medical Books.

Selected articles
 "Reps" Aren't Enough: Augmenting Functional Electrical Stimulation With Behavioral Supports Significantly Reduces Impairment in Moderately Impaired Stroke. Page SJ, Levine PG, Basobas BA. Arch Phys Med Rehabil. 2016
Mental practice—triggered electrical stimulation in chronic, moderate, upper-extremity hemiparesis after stroke. Page SJ, Levine P, Hill V. Am J Occup Ther. 2015 Jan-Feb.
 Upper-Extremity, Stroke-Specific Testing: Are Lab Tested, Stroke-Specific Outcome Measures Ready For Clinical Prime Time? Levine P. Physical Disabilities Special Interest Section Quarterly / American Occupational Therapy Association. 2009
 Mental practice in chronic stroke results of a randomized, placebo-controlled trial, SJ Page, P Levine, A Leonard, Stroke 38 (4), 1293-1297 Cited by: 295; Publication year: 2007
 Efficacy of modified constraint-induced movement therapy in chronic stroke: a single-blinded randomized controlled trial, SJ Page, SA Sisto, P Levine, RE McGrath, Archives of Physical Medicine and Rehabilitation 85 (1), 14-18, Cited by 292: Publication year 2004
 Mental practice combined with physical practice for upper-limb motor deficit in subacute stroke, SJ Page, P Levine, SA Sisto, MV Johnston, Physical Therapy 81 (8), 1455-1462, Cited by 228; published 2001
 Effects of mental practice on affected limb use and function in chronic stroke, SJ Page, P Levine, AC Leonard, Archives of Physical Medicine and Rehabilitation 86 (3), 399-402, Cited by: 202; Published 2005
 Modified constraint induced therapy: a randomized feasibility and efficacy study, SJ Page, S Sisto, P Levine, MV Johnston, M Hughes, Journal of rehabilitation research and development 38 (5), 583-590, Cited by: 201	2001
 Stroke patients' and therapists' opinions of constraint-induced movement therapy, SJ Page, P Levine, S Sisto, Q Bond, MV Johnston, Clinical rehabilitation 16 (1), 55-60, Cited by: 191; Published 2002
 Modified constraint-induced therapy in acute stroke: a randomized controlled pilot study, SJ Page, P Levine, AC Leonard, Neurorehabilitation and Neural Repair 19 (1), 27-32, Cited by: 188; Published 2005
 Modified constraint-induced therapy after subacute stroke: a preliminary study, SJ Page, SA Sisto, MV Johnston, P Levine, Neurorehabilitation and Neural Repair 16 (3), 290-295, Cited by: 152; Published 2002
 Modified constraint-induced therapy in chronic stroke: results of a single-blinded randomized controlled trial, SJ Page, P Levine, A Leonard, JP Szaflarski, BM Kissela, Physical therapy 88 (3), 333-340, Cited by: 127; Published 2008
 Modified constraint-induced therapy in chronic stroke, SJ Page, SA Sisto, P Levine, American journal of physical medicine & rehabilitation 81 (11), 870-875, Cited by: 90	2002
 Modified constraint-induced therapy in subacute stroke: a case report, SJ Page, SA Sisto, MV Johnston, P Levine, M Hughes, Archives of Physical Medicine and Rehabilitation 83 (2), 286-290, Cited by: 85	2002
 Cortical reorganization following modified constraint-induced movement therapy: a study of 4 patients with chronic stroke, JP Szaflarski, SJ Page, BM Kissela, JH Lee, P Levine, SM Strakowski, Archives of Physical Medicine and Rehabilitation 87 (8), 1052-1058, Cited by: 80; Published 2006

References

External links
 The Stronger After Stroke Blog by Peter G. Levine

1960 births
2022 deaths
George Mason University alumni
American medical researchers
People from Wyoming, Ohio
Medical educators
Union College (New Jersey) alumni